FS Class E.332 was a class of three-phase electric locomotives of the Italian State Railways (FS). They were used for the haulage of passenger trains between 1917 and 1963. Designed and built at the same time as the FS Class E.331, they represented an attempt by FS to extend the use of three-phase AC electric traction from primary to secondary routes. Their performance was disappointing and they were relegated to a marginal role, in which they remained despite several modifications.

Overview

The good results of the experiments with, and then regular use of, the three-phase AC traction system, had, by 1912, induced the FS to order 45 locomotives of Class E.550 and 16 of Class E.330. The Material and Traction Service of FS now decided to consider the possibility of breaking the monopoly of the Italian Westinghouse Company (Società Italiana Westinghouse) with the acquisition of two new classes of locomotives for passenger trains, the E.331 and the E.332.

In the spring of 1913, FS prepared the design of the mechanical part to be used for both classes and, after long private negotiations, entrusted an order for the construction of 18 locomotives to the company Costruzioni Meccaniche di Saronno. The order was divided into two. The first, dated 14 December 1913, was for 6 machines to be built according to the design of the mechanical part prepared by the FS and with the electrical part designed and built by Ateliers de Construction Oerlikon of Oerlikon, Zurich, which gave rise to the Class E.332.

The second, dated early in 1914, was for 12 machines with an E (0-10-0) wheel arrangement, intended for the haulage of freight trains, which would have constituted a new Class 051 (E.551 according to the classification of 1914). The latter, however, were not built because of the termination of the contract, which took place in the spring of 1914 for unknown reasons.

Together with the Class E331, the Class E.332 formed the last chapter in the collaboration between the FS and Swiss industry in the field of three-phase electric traction.

Numbering
The numbering in group 034 (0341-0346) originally planned was not adopted. All the machines entered service with the number E.332.1-6, adopted in the spring of 1914. The definitive numbering E.332.001-006, adopted in 1917, was practically applied in 1931.

As in all groups of three-phase alternating current system locomotives the second digit of the group number (034 and then E.332) indicated the machines with larger diameter wheels ("high wheels") intended for passenger trains.

In the definitive classification that came into force in 1917, the letter E. indicated an electric locomotive, the first digit 3 indicated the number of driving axles, the second 3 indicated machines with "high wheels" and the third digit indicated the chronological number of the project.

The identification plates affixed to the sides led, as a rule, to the marking FS 332.001 (and following) without the letter E. This was probably because the numbering was carried out in 1931 at the Grandi Riparazioni workshop in Rimini which, specializing in steam locomotives, did not have a mould for the letter "E".

Technical details

Mechanical part

The running gear allowed good riding on curves at high speed, especially on the tortuous lines of the Ligurian Riviera, in particular on the Genoa - Sampierdarena - Savona line, which was electrified on 1 September 1916.

Inspired by the E.3101 locomotive of the French Chemin de Fer du Midi, a 2'C2' wheel arrangement was used, with sloped connecting rods and jackshafts. This choice was dictated by the need to connect the large motors (2.14 metre diameter), located in the central part of the body, to the wheels without using the patented V-shaped connecting rod of the E.330.

The design of the body, containing the two control cabs, motors, and electrical and pneumatic equipment, was similar to that of the Class E.331.

Electrical part

The traction circuit was designed and patented by the Oerlikon engineers. It provided two cascade connections (6 and 8 poles) and two parallel connections (also 6 and 8 poles). The starting rheostat was of cast iron, divided into 16 steps and controlled by an electro-pneumatic switch. It, together with the motors, needed energetic cooling, and this was provided by two electric fans with a total power of 12 kW.  Overheating was a constant problem and often caused breakdowns.

Construction

According to the contract, the class should have been delivered by September 1915, but the entry of Italy into the First World War pushed all industries to favour the construction of military equipment with consequent delays to orders for civilian materials, such as locomotives. This led to a delay of about two years in deliveries, which were made as follows:

The works plates show the year of construction as 1915, so it appears that construction was already well advanced at the beginning of the hostilities.

Performance

According to the project specification, the E.332 should have delivered four speeds that, at the voltage of 3700 V and the frequency of 16.7 Hz, should have been 37, 50, 75 and 100 km / h. At these speeds, tractive effort should have been 88, 88, 93 and 59 kN.

These values were not achieved, owing to some incorrect assumptions in the design of the electrical equipment, especially regarding the combination with the cascaded motors. The defects were most obvious at low speeds.

Following modifications in 1917-1918, working on the Giovi branch line, they could independently haul a 230-tonne train (i.e. five 1921 type carriages) at a speed of 75 km / h. On the Genoa - La Spezia line, from 1925 onwards, they could haul loads up to 410 tonnes at the first three running speeds, with performance equivalent to that of the E.333.

After the war, on the Genoa - La Spezia line, the following loads were permitted:
 At 37 and 50 km / h, 430 tonnes 
 At 75 km / h, 400 tonnes
 At 100 km / h, 300 tonnes

Statistics published by FS in 1938 showed that the overall reliability of the class had improved to match the average for three-phase locomotive classes.

Service

From 1917 to 1925 Class E.332 served on the Genoa - Savona line and on the Giovi branch. From 1925 they were assigned to hauling passenger trains along the Riviera di Levante (Genoa - La Spezia line). Following the contraction of traffic generated by the economic crisis of 1929, the whole class was stored at the Rimini repair shops and remained there until 1934. From 1934 all were assigned to Turin, where they hauled trains on all the flat lines, or those with modest gradients, radiating from the Turin. Occasionally they worked trains destined for Genoa and Savona.

Depots
The locomotives were allocated to the following depots:
 From 1917 to 1921: Rivarolo Ligure 
 From 1921 to 1925: Rivarolo Ligure and Genoa Piazza Principe 
 From 1925 to 1931: Genoa (Terralba) 
 Shortly before storage at Rimini, one unit was assigned to the Florence depot, presumably for trial runs to Pistoia and Porrettana 
 From 1934: Turin 
 From 1961: Savona

Nicknames
The E.332s, like the E.331s, were dubbed "Assassins" and "Coffins" due to fatal accidents caused by the placement of electrical equipment (particularly the main switch, cooled with oil) behind the cabs without adequate protection in the event of an explosion.

Preservation
No units have been preserved

References

Further reading
    Ferrovie dello Stato. Direzione generale. Servizio Trazione, Album dei tipi delle locomotive ed automotrici. Aggiornato al 31 dicembre 1922, Firenze, Ferrovie dello Stato, 1923, tav. E 332. Rist. anast.: Colleferro, Editrice di storia dei trasporti, 1979; Ponte San Nicolò, Duegi, 2005
    Andrea Caminati, Locomotori elettrici Gruppo E.331 e E.332. Cenni preliminari, in Rivista tecnica delle ferrovie italiane, a. 4, 7 (1915), n. 6, pp. 245–246 e tav. XX-XXI f. t.
    Pietro Verole, Baldovino Marsili, La costituzione elettro-meccanica dei nuovi locomotori trifase a grande velocità 2-C-2 delle F.S., in Rivista tecnica delle ferrovie italiane, a. 5, 10 (1916), n. 5, pp. 213–237 e tav. XX-XXIX f. t.
    Pietro Verole, Andrea Caminati, L'equipaggiamento elettrico dei nuovi locomotori polifasi a grande velocità 2-C-2 Gr. E.332 delle F.S. italiane, in Rivista tecnica delle ferrovie italiane, a. 7, 13 (1918), n. 3, pp. 97–110 e tav. XV-XX f. t., n. 4, pp. 135–145 e tav. XXI-XXVI f. t.
    Mario Loria, Storia della trazione elettrica ferroviaria in Italia, tomo 1, Firenze, Giunti-Barbèra, 1971, pp. 127–133, 139-142
    Erminio Mascherpa, Cenerentole del trifase, in I treni oggi, 13 (1992), n. 132, pp. 20–26, 14 (1993), n. 133, pp. 20–28
    Giovanni Cornolò, Locomotive elettriche FS, Parma, Ermanno Albertelli, 1994, pp. 109–114
    Amici del trifase [testi: José Banaudo, Michel Braun], A vent'anni dal trifase, Pinerolo, Alzani, 1996, pp. 31 e 40-42
    Giovanni Cornolò, Martin Gut, Ferrovie trifasi nel mondo. 1895-2000, Parma, Ermanno Albertelli, 2000, pp. 290–295
    Claudio Pedrazzini, Storia dell'elettrificazione e dei locomotori trifasi F.S., Brescia, Club Fermodellistico Bresciano, 2017, pp. 166-172

E.332
Three-phase AC locomotives
 Scrapped locomotives
Standard gauge locomotives of Italy
Costruzioni Meccaniche di Saronno locomotives
2′C2′ locomotives
2-C-2 locomotives
Passenger locomotives